The Magadan Constituency (No.116) is a Russian legislative constituency in the Magadan Oblast. The constituency is the only one in Magadan Oblast, and occupies the whole of its territory.

Members elected

Election results

1993

|-
! colspan=2 style="background-color:#E9E9E9;text-align:left;vertical-align:top;" |Candidate
! style="background-color:#E9E9E9;text-align:left;vertical-align:top;" |Party
! style="background-color:#E9E9E9;text-align:right;" |Votes
! style="background-color:#E9E9E9;text-align:right;" |%
|-
|style="background-color: " |
|align=left|Yevgeny Kokorev
|align=left|Independent
|13,575
|15,03%
|-
| colspan="5" style="background-color:#E9E9E9;"|
|- style="font-weight:bold"
| colspan="3" style="text-align:left;" | Total
| 90,349
| 100%
|-
| colspan="5" style="background-color:#E9E9E9;"|
|- style="font-weight:bold"
| colspan="4" |Source:
|
|}

1995

|-
! colspan=2 style="background-color:#E9E9E9;text-align:left;vertical-align:top;" |Candidate
! style="background-color:#E9E9E9;text-align:left;vertical-align:top;" |Party
! style="background-color:#E9E9E9;text-align:right;" |Votes
! style="background-color:#E9E9E9;text-align:right;" |%
|-
|style="background-color: "|
|align=left|Valentin Tsvetkov
|align=left|Independent
|42,100
|42,52%
|-
|style="background-color: " |
|align=left|Valery Bagrov
|align=left|Liberal Democratic Party
|10,341
|10.44%
|-
|style="background-color: "|
|align=left|Nina Shcherbak
|align=left|Independent
|9,903
|10.00%
|-
|style="background-color: "|
|align=left|Valery Brayko
|align=left|Independent
|5,759
|5.82%
|-
|style="background-color: " |
|align=left|Igor Yurov
|align=left|Communist Party
|5,476
|5.53%
|-
|style="background-color: "|
|align=left|Vladimir Yudin
|align=left|Independent
|4,927
|4.98%
|-
|style="background-color:#DA2021"|
|align=left|Yevgeny Kokorev (incumbent)
|align=left|Ivan Rybkin Bloc
|3,302
|3.34%
|-
|style="background-color:#2C299A"|
|align=left|Aleksandr Aleksandrov
|align=left|Congress of Russian Communities
|2,302
|2.33%
|-
|style="background-color:#3A46CE"|
|align=left|Georgy Zhzhonov
|align=left|Democratic Choice of Russia – United Democrats
|1,967
|1.99%
|-
|style="background-color:"|
|align=left|Nikolay Lastenkov
|align=left|Yabloko
|1,782
|1.80%
|-
|style="background-color: "|
|align=left|Svetlana Kachemayeva
|align=left|Independent
|1,454
|1.47%
|-
|style="background-color:#23238E"|
|align=left|Vladimir Barlyayev
|align=left|Our Home – Russia
|834
|0.84%
|-
|style="background-color: "|
|align=left|Anton Kaminsky
|align=left|Independent
|488
|0.49%
|-
|style="background-color:#000000"|
|colspan=2 |against all
|8,373
|8.40%
|-
| colspan="5" style="background-color:#E9E9E9;"|
|- style="font-weight:bold"
| colspan="3" style="text-align:left;" | Total
| 99,858
| 100%
|-
| colspan="5" style="background-color:#E9E9E9;"|
|- style="font-weight:bold"
| colspan="4" |Source:
|
|}

1997

|-
! colspan=2 style="background-color:#E9E9E9;text-align:left;vertical-align:top;" |Candidate
! style="background-color:#E9E9E9;text-align:left;vertical-align:top;" |Party
! style="background-color:#E9E9E9;text-align:right;" |Votes
! style="background-color:#E9E9E9;text-align:right;" |%
|-
|style="background-color: "|
|align=left|Vladimir Butkeyev
|align=left|Independent
|10,200
|14.60%
|-
| colspan="5" style="background-color:#E9E9E9;"|
|- style="font-weight:bold"
| colspan="3" style="text-align:left;" | Total
| 72,410
| 100%
|-
| colspan="5" style="background-color:#E9E9E9;"|
|- style="font-weight:bold"
| colspan="4" |Source:
|
|}

1999

|-
! colspan=2 style="background-color:#E9E9E9;text-align:left;vertical-align:top;" |Candidate
! style="background-color:#E9E9E9;text-align:left;vertical-align:top;" |Party
! style="background-color:#E9E9E9;text-align:right;" |Votes
! style="background-color:#E9E9E9;text-align:right;" |%
|-
|style="background-color: "|
|align=left|Vladimir Butkeyev (incumbent)
|align=left|Independent
|34,245
|38.93%
|-
|style="background-color: "|
|align=left|Aleksandr Aleksandrov
|align=left|Independent
|7,836
|8.91%
|-
|style="background-color: " |
|align=left|Vladislav Goncharov
|align=left|Communist Party
|7,110
|8.08%
|-
|style="background-color: " |
|align=left|Yury Kuznetsov
|align=left|Liberal Democratic Party
|5,588
|6.35%
|-
|style="background-color: "|
|align=left|Aleksandr Basansky
|align=left|Independent
|5,495
|6.25%
|-
|style="background-color: "|
|align=left|Vladimir Yudin
|align=left|Independent
|5,094
|5.79%
|-
|style="background-color: "|
|align=left|Vyacheslav Kobets
|align=left|Independent
|4,291
|4.88%
|-
|style="background-color: "|
|align=left|Yevgeny Kokorev
|align=left|Independent
|2,658
|3.02%
|-
|style="background-color: "|
|align=left|Ivan Syrbu
|align=left|Independent
|2,537
|2.88%
|-
|style="background-color: "|
|align=left|Yury Bilibin
|align=left|Independent
|2,191
|2.49%
|-
|style="background-color: "|
|align=left|Vladimir Serbinov
|align=left|Independent
|1,943
|2.21%
|-
|style="background-color:#000000"|
|colspan=2 |against all
|8,144
|9.26%
|-
| colspan="5" style="background-color:#E9E9E9;"|
|- style="font-weight:bold"
| colspan="3" style="text-align:left;" | Total
| 87,972
| 100%
|-
| colspan="5" style="background-color:#E9E9E9;"|
|- style="font-weight:bold"
| colspan="4" |Source:
|
|}

2003

|-
! colspan=2 style="background-color:#E9E9E9;text-align:left;vertical-align:top;" |Candidate
! style="background-color:#E9E9E9;text-align:left;vertical-align:top;" |Party
! style="background-color:#E9E9E9;text-align:right;" |Votes
! style="background-color:#E9E9E9;text-align:right;" |%
|-
|style="background-color:"|
|align=left|Stanislav Yeliseykin
|align=left|United Russia
|26,146
|36.31%
|-
|style="background-color: "|
|align=left|Vladimir Butkeyev (incumbent)
|align=left|Independent
|24,589
|34.15%
|-
|style="background-color:#C21022"|
|align=left|Yelena Vyalbe
|align=left|Russian Pensioners' Party-Party of Social Justice
|5,257
|7.30%
|-
|style="background-color: " |
|align=left|Yury Davydenko
|align=left|Communist Party
|3,213
|4.46%
|-
|style="background-color: " |
|align=left|Yury Grishan
|align=left|Liberal Democratic Party
|2,926
|4.06%
|-
|style="background-color: "|
|align=left|Anatoly Shestayev
|align=left|Independent
|820
|1.14%
|-
|style="background-color: "|
|align=left|Artur Suleymenov
|align=left|Independent
|754
|1.05%
|-
|style="background-color:"|
|align=left|Nina Stepanenko
|align=left|Rodina
|744
|1.03%
|-
|style="background-color:#00A1FF"|
|align=left|Tatyana Bagalova
|align=left|Party of Russia's Rebirth-Russian Party of Life
|735
|1.02%
|-
|style="background-color:"|
|align=left|Sergey Tyaglov
|align=left|Yabloko
|412
|0.57%
|-
|style="background-color: "|
|align=left|Sabina Strelchenko
|align=left|Independent
|346
|0.48%
|-
|style="background-color:#000000"|
|colspan=2 |against all
|5359
|7.44%
|-
| colspan="5" style="background-color:#E9E9E9;"|
|- style="font-weight:bold"
| colspan="3" style="text-align:left;" | Total
| 72,003
| 100%
|-
| colspan="5" style="background-color:#E9E9E9;"|
|- style="font-weight:bold"
| colspan="4" |Source:
|
|}

2016

|-
! colspan=2 style="background-color:#E9E9E9;text-align:left;vertical-align:top;" |Candidate
! style="background-color:#E9E9E9;text-align:left;vertical-align:top;" |Party
! style="background-color:#E9E9E9;text-align:right;" |Votes
! style="background-color:#E9E9E9;text-align:right;" |%
|-
|style="background-color: " |
|align=left|Oksana Bondar
|align=left|United Russia
|19,668
|46.49%
|-
|style="background-color: " |
|align=left|Sergey Ivanitsky
|align=left|Communist Party
|6,252
|14.78%
|-
|style="background-color: " |
|align=left|Roman Isayev
|align=left|Liberal Democratic Party
|5,863
|13.86%
|-
|style="background-color: " |
|align=left|Igor Novikov
|align=left|A Just Russia
|4,654
|11.00%
|-
|style="background: #E62020;"| 
|align=left|Yury Davydenko
|align=left|Communists of Russia
|2,571
|6.07%
|-
|style="background-color: " |
|align=left|Pavel Zhukov
|align=left|Yabloko
|1,306
|3.09%
|-
| colspan="5" style="background-color:#E9E9E9;"|
|- style="font-weight:bold"
| colspan="3" style="text-align:left;" | Total
| 42,308
| 100%
|-
| colspan="5" style="background-color:#E9E9E9;"|
|- style="font-weight:bold"
| colspan="4" |Source:
|
|}

2021

|-
! colspan=2 style="background-color:#E9E9E9;text-align:left;vertical-align:top;" |Candidate
! style="background-color:#E9E9E9;text-align:left;vertical-align:top;" |Party
! style="background-color:#E9E9E9;text-align:right;" |Votes
! style="background-color:#E9E9E9;text-align:right;" |%
|-
|style="background-color: " |
|align=left|Anton Basansky
|align=left|United Russia
|21,487
|54.30%
|-
|style="background-color: " |
|align=left|Aleksey Popov
|align=left|Communist Party
|7,770
|19.64%
|-
|style="background-color: " |
|align=left|Roman Isayev
|align=left|Liberal Democratic Party
|3,332
|8.42%
|-
|style="background-color: " |
|align=left|Snezhana Gakhramanova
|align=left|A Just Russia — For Truth
|2,860
|7.23%
|-
|style="background: #E62020;"| 
|align=left|Yury Davydenko
|align=left|Communists of Russia
|2,552
|6.45%
|-
| colspan="5" style="background-color:#E9E9E9;"|
|- style="font-weight:bold"
| colspan="3" style="text-align:left;" | Total
| 39,572
| 100%
|-
| colspan="5" style="background-color:#E9E9E9;"|
|- style="font-weight:bold"
| colspan="4" |Source:
|
|}

Notes

Sources
116. Магаданский одномандатный избирательный округ

References

Russian legislative constituencies
Politics of Magadan Oblast